Shilo Klein  is a New Zealand rugby union player who plays for the  in Super Rugby. His playing position is hooker.
Klein was born in the USA; he was brought up in Christchurch where he attended St Andrews College.

Reference list

External links
 itsrugby.co.uk profile

New Zealand rugby union players
Living people
Rugby union hookers
1999 births
Canterbury rugby union players
Crusaders (rugby union) players
San Diego Legion players